Garland v. Gonzalez, 596 U.S. ___ (2022), was a United States Supreme Court case related to immigration detention.

Background 

Aliens who have been ordered to be deported by immigration courts can be detained by the federal government, pending their removal from the country. The statute that authorizes such detention does not contain a set time limit for the detention, but in Zadvydas v. Davis (2001), the Supreme Court read in a six-month limitation to avoid what it perceived were constitutional issues. Two separate classes of aliens filed lawsuits in the United States District Courts for the Northern District of California and Western District of Washington. The courts granted class action status, and enjoined enforcement of the law by the United States Department of Homeland Security, ruling the aliens must be provided with bond hearings where the government had the burden of proving that they are flight risks or dangers to the community. The federal government appealed to the United States Court of Appeals for the Ninth Circuit, which affirmed, over the dissent of Judge Ferdinand Fernandez. The government subsequently filed a petition for a writ of certiorari.

Supreme Court 

Certiorari was granted in the case and the companion case Johnson v. Arteaga-Martinez on August 23, 2021. The court also asked for briefing in Gonzalez on the question of whether a separate provision of the statute stripped the lower courts over the jurisdiction necessary to issue a class-wide injunction. Oral arguments were held on January 11, 2022. On June 13, 2022, the Supreme Court reversed the Ninth Circuit in a 6–3 vote, with Justice Samuel Alito writing the majority opinion, and Justice Sonia Sotomayor concurring in the judgment in part and dissenting in part.

Opinion of the Court 

The court’s majority opinion authored by Justice Alito concluded that section 1252(f)(1) of the INA deprived the district courts of jurisdiction to issue the class-wide injunction.  The court’s ruling was based on the premises that 1) “enjoin” in 1252(f)(1) [“to enjoin or restrain the operation of the provisions”] is best read in its broader meaning which includes “require”, and 2) “operation” means “implementation as is” and not “implementation in accordance with the law”. The court backed the latter determination by citing many other instances in case law in which “unlawful” or “improper” “operation[s]” are discussed.  Furthermore, the court argued, if respondents' interpretation were to be adopted, 1252(f)(1) would cover only constitutional claims with almost no exception: 

“But it would be most unusual for Congress to disfavor constitutional claims in this way. Cf. Webster v. Doe, 486 U. S. 592, 603 (1988) (requiring “clear” indication of congressional intent to “preclude judicial review of constitutional claims”). And if Congress had wanted to target just constitutional claims, it could have surely made the point more directly.” 

In addition the court  emphasized the singular-person character of the language - “an individual alien”, and cited a previous case which held that provision to bar class-wide injunction by lower courts.

Sotomayor's Opinion 

Justice Sotomayor wrote an opinion concurring in judgement in part “because the government prevails on the merits”, while dissenting on the jurisdiction issue. Justice Kagan joined fully, and Justice Breyer partially. Justice Sotomayor described the court as “elevate[ing] piecemeal dictionary definitions and policy concerns over plain meaning and context”.  She then turned to context for illuminating the primary clause, arguing that the statute’s regular use of “implementation” in place of the court’s “operation”, and its use of “enjoin” in a more narrow sense in other provisions, suggests an interpretation that doesn’t strip the lower courts of their injunctive power in cases like these.  Along with this, the dissent disregarded the courts list of improper “operation[s]”, reasoning that “Unlike all of those examples, a statute is the law. Officials may implement a statute unlawfully, but a statute does not operate in conflict with itself.” 

In response to the court’s emphasis on the word “individual”, the dissent cited Califano v. Goldfarb as a case that held the mere use of “individual” not to preclude classwide relief.

References

External links 
 

2022 in United States case law
United States Supreme Court cases
United States Supreme Court cases of the Roberts Court
United States immigration and naturalization case law